Georg Franz August Graf von Buquoy   (7 September 1781 in Brussels – 9 or 19 April 1851 in Prague) was a Bohemian aristocrat, mathematician, and inventor. He studied mathematics, natural science, philosophy, and economics at the Prague and Vienna universities. In 1810 he constructed an early steam engine. Most of all, he was engaged in the glass works in Nové Hrady region. On the basis of many experiments he succeeded in inventing an original process technology of a black opaque glass called hyalite (1817), as well as completing the production process for red hyalite (1819).

See also
Lords of Bucquoy

External links
Short biography

1781 births
1851 deaths
19th-century Czech scientists